Fundació Esportiva Grama is a Spanish football team based in Santa Coloma de Gramenet, Barcelona, in the autonomous community of Catalonia. Founded on 2 July 2013, it plays in Tercera División RFEF – Group 5, holding home games at Nou Municipal de Gramenet, with a capacity of 5,000.

Season to season

2 seasons in Tercera División
1 season in Tercera División RFEF

References

External links
Official website 
Fútbol Regional team profile 
Soccerway team profile

Football clubs in Catalonia
Association football clubs established in 2013
2013 establishments in Spain
Santa Coloma de Gramenet